The canton of La Grave is a former administrative division in southeastern France. It was disbanded following the French canton reorganisation which came into effect in March 2015. It consisted of 2 communes, which joined the new canton of Briançon-1 in 2015. It had 797 inhabitants (2012).

The canton comprised the following communes:
La Grave
Villar-d'Arêne

Demographics

See also
Cantons of the Hautes-Alpes department

References

Former cantons of Hautes-Alpes
2015 disestablishments in France
States and territories disestablished in 2015